In mathematics, an Artin L-function is a type of Dirichlet series associated to a linear representation ρ of a Galois group G. These functions were introduced in 1923 by Emil Artin, in connection with his research into class field theory. Their fundamental properties, in particular the Artin conjecture described below,  have turned out to be resistant to easy proof. One of the aims of proposed non-abelian class field theory is to incorporate the complex-analytic nature of Artin L-functions into a larger framework, such as is provided by automorphic forms and the Langlands program. So far, only a small part of such a theory has been put on a firm basis.

Definition

(Here N is the field norm of an ideal.)

When  is ramified, and I is the inertia group which is a subgroup of G, a similar construction is applied, but to the subspace of V fixed (pointwise) by I.

The Artin L-function  is then the infinite product over all prime ideals  of these factors. As Artin reciprocity shows, when G is an abelian group these L-functions have a second description (as Dirichlet L-functions when K is the rational number field, and as Hecke L-functions in general). Novelty comes in with non-abelian G and their representations.

One application is to give factorisations of Dedekind zeta-functions, for example in the case of a number field that is Galois over the rational numbers. In accordance with the decomposition of the regular representation into irreducible representations, such a zeta-function splits into a product of Artin L-functions, for each irreducible representation of G. For example, the simplest case is when G is the symmetric group on three letters. Since G has an irreducible representation of degree 2, an Artin L-function for such a representation occurs, squared, in the factorisation of the Dedekind zeta-function for such a number field, in a product with the Riemann zeta-function (for the trivial representation) and an L-function of Dirichlet's type for the signature representation.

More precisely for  a Galois extension of degree n, the factorization

follows from

Since characters are an orthonormal basis of the class functions, after showing some analytic properties of the  we obtain the Chebotarev density theorem as a generalization of Dirichlet's theorem on arithmetic progressions.

Functional equation
Artin L-functions satisfy a functional equation.

,

with a certain complex number W(ρ) of absolute value 1. It is the Artin root number. It has been studied deeply with respect to two types of properties. Firstly Robert Langlands and Pierre Deligne established a factorisation into Langlands–Deligne local constants; this is significant in relation to conjectural relationships to automorphic representations. Also the case of ρ and ρ* being equivalent representations is exactly the one in which the functional equation has the same L-function on each side. It is, algebraically speaking, the case when ρ is a real representation or quaternionic representation. The Artin root number is, then, either +1 or −1. The question of which sign occurs is linked to Galois module theory.

The Artin conjecture
The Artin conjecture on Artin L-functions states that the Artin L-function  of a non-trivial irreducible representation ρ is analytic in the whole complex plane.

This is known for one-dimensional representations, the L-functions being then associated to Hecke characters — and in particular for Dirichlet L-functions. More generally Artin showed that the Artin conjecture is true for all representations induced from 1-dimensional representations. If the Galois group is supersolvable or more generally  monomial, then all representations are of this form so the Artin conjecture holds.

André Weil proved the Artin conjecture in the case of function fields.

Two-dimensional representations are classified by the nature of the image subgroup: it may be cyclic, dihedral, tetrahedral, octahedral, or icosahedral. The Artin conjecture for the cyclic or dihedral case follows easily from Erich Hecke's work. Langlands used the base change lifting to prove  the tetrahedral case, and Jerrold Tunnell extended his work to cover the octahedral case; Andrew Wiles used these cases in his proof of the Taniyama–Shimura conjecture. Richard Taylor and others have made some progress on the (non-solvable) icosahedral case; this is an active area of research. The Artin conjecture for odd, irreducible, two-dimensional representations follows from the proof of Serre's modularity conjecture, regardless of projective image subgroup.

Brauer's theorem on induced characters implies that all Artin L-functions are  products of positive and negative integral powers of Hecke L-functions, and are therefore meromorphic in the whole complex plane.

 pointed out that the Artin conjecture  follows from strong enough results from the Langlands philosophy, relating to the L-functions associated to automorphic representations for GL(n) for all . More precisely, the Langlands conjectures associate an automorphic representation of the adelic group GLn(AQ)  to every n-dimensional irreducible representation of the Galois group, which is a cuspidal representation if the Galois representation is irreducible, such that the Artin L-function of the Galois representation is the same as the automorphic L-function of the automorphic representation. The Artin conjecture then follows immediately from the known fact that the L-functions of cuspidal automorphic representations are holomorphic. This was one of the major motivations for Langlands' work.

The Dedekind conjecture

A weaker conjecture (sometimes known as Dedekind conjecture) states that
if M/K is an extension of number fields, then the quotient
 of their Dedekind zeta functions is entire.

The Aramata-Brauer theorem states that the conjecture holds if M/K is Galois.

More generally, let N the Galois closure of M over K,
and G the Galois group of N/K.
The quotient  is equal to the
Artin L-functions associated to the natural representation associated to the
action of G on the K-invariants complex embedding of M. Thus the Artin conjecture implies the Dedekind conjecture.

The conjecture was proven when G is a solvable group, independently by Koji Uchida and R. W. van der Waall in 1975.

See also
Equivariant L-function

Notes

References

Bibliography

 Reprinted in his collected works, . English translation in Artin L-Functions: A Historical Approach by N. Snyder.

Zeta and L-functions
Class field theory